Hexablemma is a monotypic genus of araneomorph spiders in the family Tetrablemmidae containing the single species, Hexablemma cataphractum. It was first described by Lucien Berland in 1920 from a female found in Kenya. It was separated from Tetrablemma in 1978 for this single species, because it doesn't belong there, but doesn't seem to belong anywhere else either.

See also
 List of Tetrablemmidae species

References

Endemic fauna of Kenya
Monotypic Araneomorphae genera
Spiders of Africa
Taxa named by Lucien Berland
Tetrablemmidae